Robert Magnus Martinson (May 19, 1927August 11, 1979) was an American sociologist, whose 1974 study "What Works?", concerning the shortcomings of existing prisoner rehabilitation programs, was highly influential, creating what became known as the "nothing works" doctrine.  His later studies were more optimistic, but less influential at the time.  He served as chairman of the Sociology Department at the City College of New York, and then founded the Center for Knowledge in Criminal Justice Planning.

Life and career
Martinson was born on May 19, 1927, in Minneapolis, Minnesota to Magnus Constantine Martinson and Gwendolyn A. Gagnon. He received his degrees – BA (1949), MA (1953), PhD (1968) – from the University of California, Berkeley.

In 1959 he ran for mayor of Berkeley, California as the Socialist Party candidate.

Martinson was a participant in the 1961 Freedom Riders, spending over a month in two Mississippi jails, and wrote about his experience for The Nation.  He also wrote a longer academic study of the group dynamics within his cohort of imprisoned Freedom Riders.  His incarceration generated his interest in penology.

He married Rita J. Carter on September 18, 1961, in San Francisco, California.

Martinson's investigation with Douglas Lipton and Judith Wilks regarding rehabilitation of inmates in prison had been commissioned in 1966 by the New York State Governor's Commission on Criminal Offenders.  It covered 231 earlier studies, dated from 1945 to 1967.  Their first draft had been completed in 1970, but because the results were considered unsuitable, the report was initially suppressed.  It later became available after an unrelated court case.

Something of a public figure at the time, Martinson was interviewed by People magazine and on 60 Minutes (August 24, 1975), asserting that "nothing works" in prison rehabilitation.  His work was embraced by politicians, and inspired a wave of strong sentencing and cancellation of rehabilitation programs.  Academics, however, strongly criticized his studies, for drawing conclusions from mostly untrained practitioners in underfunded programs, and he himself later reversed his stance.

Martinson committed suicide on August 11, 1979, by leaping from his fifteenth floor Manhattan apartment.

Works

References

External links 
 Robert Martinson and the Tragedy of the American Prison, Article by Adam Humphreys on ribbonfarm.com, dated December 15, 2016
Incarceration as Incapacitation: An Intellectual History, Article by Timothy Crimmins in American Affairs, Volume II, Number 3 (Fall 2018): 144–66.

1927 births
1979 suicides
Freedom Riders
City College of New York faculty
Scientists from Minneapolis
University of California, Berkeley alumni
Suicides by jumping in New York City
American criminologists
Socialist Party of America politicians from California
Politicians from Berkeley, California
Prisoners and detainees of Mississippi
American people of Swedish descent